Thomas John Umberg (born September 25, 1955) is an American politician who serves in the California State Senate. A Democrat, he represents the 34th district, which encompasses parts of northern Orange County and a small portion of Long Beach. Previously, he served in the California State Assembly, representing the 69th District. He is a partner at Umberg Zipser LLP in Orange County.

Military service and family
Born in Cincinnati, Ohio of German ancestry, Umberg graduated with honors from the University of California, Los Angeles in 1977. He was commissioned Second Lieutenant in the U.S. Army, then promoted to captain. Umberg served with the 2nd Infantry Division in South Korea and with NATO forces in Italy during his time in the army. Umberg also served as a paratrooper with the US Army Special Operations Command, US Army Special Warfare Center and the XVIIIth Airborne Corp. Umberg completed the Harvard University, Kennedy School of Public Policy, Program for Senior Executives in National Security. He was also awarded a master's degree in Strategic Studies from the U.S. Army War College. Umberg remained in the U.S. Army Reserve, rising to the rank of colonel.  Umberg's military decorations include: the Bronze Star, Meritorious Service Medal (2d award), the US Coast Guard Distinguished Public Service Award, the Army Commendation Medal (2d award), the Army Achievement Medal. Umberg is married to Brigadier General (USA) Robin Umberg, and has three children, Brett, Tommy, and Erin Umberg.  Tommy and Erin Umberg are both attending law school at UC Berkeley.

Early career
After receiving his Juris Doctor degree from UC Hastings College of the Law in 1980, he was appointed an Assistant U.S. Attorney in Orange County. He had a 100% conviction rate prosecuting drug dealers, gang members, white collar criminals, and civil rights cases. He also served as a military prosecutor between 1980 and 1985.

Elected office

First stint in Assembly
Umberg was first elected to the California State Assembly in 1990, defeating incumbent Republican Curt Pringle. Umberg was re-elected in 1992. While in the Assembly he served as Chairman of the Environmental Safety and Toxic Materials Committee. Instead of seeking a third term in 1994, Umberg ran for Attorney General of California but lost to Republican Dan Lungren in the general election.

Clinton Administration
Umberg then joined the law firm of Morrison & Foerster LLP in 1995 as a partner. He was the Managing Partner of Morrison & Foerster's Orange County Office from 2003 until 2005.  During the 1996 presidential election, he served as the chairman of the Clinton re-election campaign in California. Clinton appointed Umberg as the Deputy Director of the Office of National Drug Control Policy in 1997.

Second stint in Assembly
In 2000, Umberg left the Clinton administration and returned to California. In 2002, he lost the Democratic Party nomination for State Insurance Commissioner to John Garamendi. In 2004, Umberg won election to the Assembly to represent the 69th District. During his third term, Umberg chaired the Elections and Redistriciting Committee. While in the legislature, Umberg authored over 60 measures which became law. These laws include measures dealing with hate crimes, white collar crime, campaign finance reform, high-speed rail transport and school meal programs.

2006 Senate campaign
Umberg sought the seat of retiring State Senator Joe Dunn (D) in the 2006 elections. Orange County Supervisor and former Assemblyman Lou Correa jumped in the race in January 2006 despite pressure from the local Democratic party for him to stay out (although with pressure from the state Democratic party for him to jump in), stating that he was running in part because of the allegations about Umberg's residency. Aside from other negative articles, Umberg also received criticism that he voted to legalize gay marriage. Umberg attempted to get Correa off the ballot because Correa submitted more than the number of signatures required to qualify for the ballot, but ultimately failed. Umberg also claimed that an alliance between Correa and State Senate President Pro Tem Don Perata to funnel funds to Correa's campaign was illegal. Umberg was defeated by Correa by a 60% to 40% margin, and Correa went on to narrowly win the general election.

Orange County Supervisorial campaign
After Correa won the general election for the state Senate by a 1% margin, Umberg entered the race to replace Correa on the Orange County Board of Supervisors, representing the 1st Supervisorial District. 52% of 1st Supervisorial District voters are also voters in the 69th Assembly District, formerly represented by Umberg. 73% of 1st Supervisorial District voters are also 34th Senate District voters, so Umberg was believed to be the favorite. On 6 February 2007, Umberg received 21.4%, coming in third, far less than he had been expected to poll.  The winner was Garden Grove City councilwoman Janet Nguyen.

Electoral history

 2007 Orange County Board of Supervisors, 1st District
 Janet Nguyen (R), 10,919 - 24.1%
 Trung Nguyen (R), 10,912 - 24.1%
 Tom Umberg (D), 9,725 - 21.4%
 Carlos Bustamante (R), 7,460 - 16.5%
 2006 Democratic Primary Election for State Senate, 34th District
 Lou Correa (D), 17,409 - 59.8%
 Tom Umberg (D), 11,731 - 40.2%
 2004 General Election for State Assembly, 69th District
 Tom Umberg (D), 38,516 - 61.4%
 Otto Bade (R), 19,811 - 31.5%
 George Reis (L), 4,470 - 7.1%
 2004 Democratic Primary Election for State Assembly, 69th District
 Tom Umberg (D), 8,498 - 51.2%
 Claudia Alvarez (D), 8,122 - 48.8%
 2002 Democratic Primary Election for Insurance Commissioner
 John Garamendi (D), 800,146 - 38.6%
 Tom Umberg (D), 586,112 - 28.3%
 Thomas M. Calderon (D), 476,234 - 22.9%
 Bill Winslow (D), 213,239 - 10.2%
 1994 General Election for Attorney General
 Dan Lungren (R), 4,438,733 - 53.9%
 Tom Umberg (D), 3,256,070 - 39.5%
 Richard N. Burns (L) - 274,335 - 3.3%
 Robert J. Evans (P&F) 271,459 - 3.3%
 1994 Democratic Primary Election for Attorney General
 Tom Umberg (D), 1,715,098 - 100.0%
 1992 General Election for State Assembly, 69th District
 Tom Umberg (D), 32,700 - 60.0%
 Jo Ellen Allen (R), 18,560 - 34.1%
 David R. Keller (L), 3,217 - 5.9%
 1992 Democratic Primary Election for State Assembly, 69th District
 Tom Umberg (D), 9,637 - 100.0%
 1990 General Election for State Assembly, 72nd District
 Tom Umberg (D), 25,247 - 51.9%
 Curt Pringle (R), 23,411 - 48.1%

References

External links
 
 Umberg/Zipzer LLP
 Official campaign web site for Umberg's supervisor campaign, archived in 2007
 Official Morrison & Foerster biography
 Join California Tom Umberg
 

Democratic Party California state senators
1955 births
Living people
American people of German descent
Harvard Kennedy School alumni
Democratic Party members of the California State Assembly
United States Army officers
University of California, Los Angeles alumni
University of California, Hastings College of the Law alumni
21st-century American politicians
Recipients of the Meritorious Service Medal (United States)
20th-century American politicians
People associated with Morrison & Foerster